A by-election was held for the New South Wales Legislative Assembly electorate of Moreton, Wide Bay, Burnett, Maranoa, Leichhardt and Port Curtis on 19 November 1857 because Gordon Sandeman resigned to concentrate on his business interests.

Dates

Result

Gordon Sandeman resigned.

See also
Electoral results for the district of Moreton, Wide Bay, Burnett, Maranoa, Leichhardt and Port Curtis
List of New South Wales state by-elections

References

1857 elections in Australia
New South Wales state by-elections
1850s in New South Wales